Apisai is a given name of Fijian origin and may refer to:

Apisai Ielemia (born 1955), Tuvaluan Politician
Apisai Koroisau (born 1992), Australian-Fijian Rugby League player
Apisai Naevo, Fijian Chief
Apisai Naikatini (born 1985), Fijian Rugby Union player
Apisai Smith (born 1985), Fijian Footballer
Apisai Tora (born 1934), Fijian Politician

See also
Apisa